Vitalien Laurent (born Louis Philippe Olivier Laurent; Séné, 26 May 1896 – Paris, 21 November 1973) was a French priest and Byzantinist. He was editor of the journal Échos d'Orient (predecessor of the Revue des études byzantines).

He published nearly 700 works in the fields of Greek hagiography, Byzantine history, Byzantine sigillography and Byzantine ecclesiastical history. Most notably, he edited Sylvester Syropoulos' account of the Council of Florence, the registers of the acts of Constantinople's Patriarchy (years 1204–1309) and a synodal tome from the age of Patriarch Matthew the 1st.

Sources
 

1896 births
1973 deaths
French Byzantinists